John Baptist Liu Jingshan (October 24, 1913 – February 4, 2013) was the Roman Catholic bishop of the Roman Catholic Diocese of Ningxia, China.

Ordained to the priesthood in 1942, Liu Jingshan was named bishop in 1993 at age eighty and was recognized by the Chinese government and the Holy See. He retired in 2009.

Notes

1913 births
2013 deaths
21st-century Roman Catholic bishops in China
People from Bayannur
20th-century Roman Catholic bishops in China